The A9 is a national road in Latvia connecting Riga to third largest city of Latvia, Liepāja through Skulte, also known as Liepāja highway in Latvia. The road is part of Latvian TEN-T road network. After Liepāja, the road turns in to Latvian A11.  The length of A9 in Latvian territory  is 200 kilometers. Currently A9 has 1x1 lanes in all its length. The current speed limit is 90 km/h. It is planned that around year 2020 all at-grade intersections with A9, in the segment from Riga to Jaunbērze, would be removed, and two-level ones would be built instead, with an option to widen the A9 to 2x2 lanes in further future. from Riga until Jaunbērze,  The average AADT of A9 in 2015 was 5,379 cars per day.

References

A09